Leptoclinides cucurbitus is an Ascidiacea from the family Didemnidae. The scientific name of the species was first published and made valid by Kott in 2004.

References

Sanamyan, K. (2012). Leptoclinides cucurbitus Kott, 2004. In: Shenkar, N.; Gittenberger, A.; Lambert, G.; Rius, M.; Moreira Da Rocha, R.; Swalla, B.J.; Turron, X. (2012) Ascidiacea World Database.
 Accessed via: World Register of Marine Species at http://www.marinespecies.org/aphia.php?p=taxdetails&id=250726

Enterogona